Salamander is a Belgian crime drama television series, created by and based upon the novel by Bavo Dhooge, that was first broadcast on Eén on 30 December 2012. The twelve-part series, produced by Skyline Entertainment and written by Ward Hulselmans, stars Filip Peeters as Inspector Paul Gerardi, a Belgian detective who investigates the theft of sixty-six safety deposit boxes belonging to prominent Belgian figures.
It was broadcast in the United Kingdom on BBC Four from 8 February 2014. Following the success of the first series, a second series was commissioned by Eén but production did not begin until five years later. The second series is subtitled Blood Diamonds and was first broadcast on 7 January 2018. BBC Four broadcast from 14 April 2018.

Plot

Series 1
Jonkhere, a  small private bank in Brussels, is robbed and 66 safe deposit boxes belonging to a number of the most prominent public figures in Belgium are cleaned out. The owners want to keep the thefts under wraps, presumably to avoid scandal. Police Inspector Paul Gerardi (Filip Peeters) carries out the investigation. He discovers the connection; that the victims are members of a secret organisation called Salamander. This is a cabal of the country's industrial, financial, judicial and political elite; the safe-deposit boxes contained secrets as far back as World War II. Gerardi becomes the target of both the criminals and the authorities.

Series 2
Chief Inspector Gerardi opens an investigation after political refugee Léon Tchité is murdered. He becomes entangled in a blood diamonds network.

Production
Filming began in Brussels in May 2011. Filming locations include Brussels Park, Egmont Park, the exterior of the Belgian Federal Parliament, Cinquantenaire, Law Courts of Brussels, Brussels-South railway station and Hotel Metropole. Funding was provided by Vlaamse Radio- en Televisieomroeporganisatie and the Belgian Tax Shelter.

BBC Four acquired Salamander in 2013 and first broadcast commenced from 8 February 2014. Sue Deeks, head of acquisition for the BBC said, "'Salamander' is a gripping, edge-of-the seat thriller. It will make a fantastic addition to our Saturday nights on BBC4". The series was also acquired by RTBF and later by Netflix. The first series was later released on DVD in the United Kingdom via Arrow Films on 17 March 2014.

Salamander was set for an English-language remake, as an international co-production between Cite Amerique and the British Artist Studio, but later, production switched to ABC Studios, where a pilot for a potential 2017-2018 series was ordered on 31 January 2017.

Cast

Main cast
 Filip Peeters as Inspector Paul Gerardi
 Violet Braeckman as Sofie Gerardi
 Tine Reymer as Patricia Wolfs
 Koen Van Impe as Vic Adams
 Wim Opbrouck as Marc De Coutere 
 Emilie Van Nieuwenhuyze as Nicola Wolfs
 Leah Thys as Martine Callier

Supporting cast

Series 1 (2012—2013)

 Koen De Bouw as Joachim Klaus
 Mike Verdrengh as Raymond Jonkhere
 Lucas Van den Eynde as Carl Cassimon
 Jo De Meyere as Armand Persigal
 Warre Borgmans as Commissaris Martin Colla
 Vic De Wachter as Gil Wolfs
 Kevin Janssens as Vincent Noël
 Tom De Hoog as Patrick Dejonghe
 An Miller as Sarah Debruycker
 Els Olaerts as Yolande
 Jan Van den Bosch as Vic's Assistant
 Bart Hollanders as Victor

Series 2: Blood Diamonds (2018)

 Vera Van Dooren as Commissaris Monda 
 Jeroen Van der Ven as Antony Minnebach 
 Boris Van Severen as Jamie Capelle 
 Michael Vergauwen as Jokke De Moor
 Peter Van De Velde as René Kroneborg 
 Govert Deploige as Alain
 Tom Van Bauwel as Roger Roppe 
 Herbert Flack as Jonatan Bury
 Kadèr Gürbüz as Sabine Kroneborg

Episodes

Series 1 (2012—2013)

Reception
Ben Lawrence of The Daily Telegraph gave the first two episodes three stars out of five and called its plot "compelling".

Series 2: Blood Diamonds (2018)

References

External links
 Eén: Salamander
 
 BETA Film: Salamander
 

Belgian crime television series
Belgian drama television shows
2012 Belgian television series debuts
2010s Belgian television series
Eén original programming
Flemish television shows
Television shows set in Belgium
Television shows set in Brussels